Washington Township is one of ten townships in Daviess County, Indiana. As of the 2010 census, its population was 15,534 and it contained 6,771 housing units.

History
Washington Township was organized on 12 May 1817 at the first meeting of the Daviess County Commissioners.  Among its earliest settlements was the community of Liverpool, which later became subsumed into the county seat of Washington, which is located in Washington Township.

County Bridge No. 45, Jefferson Elementary School, and Prairie Creek Site are listed on the National Register of Historic Places.

Geography
Blue Hole Pond, Snyder Pond and Swan Pond are in this township.

Cities and towns
 Washington

Unincorporated towns
 Graham
 Jordan
 Lettsville
 Maysville
 South Washington
 Thomas

Adjacent townships
 Steele Township (north)
 Vigo Township, Knox County (north)
 Bogard Township (northeast)
 Barr Township (east)
 Harrison Township (southeast)
 Veale Township (south)
 Harrison Township, Knox County (southwest)
 Steen Township, Knox County (west)

Major highways

Cemeteries
The township contains five cemeteries: Colbert, Hawkins, New Veale Creek, Oak Grove and Saint Johns.

References
 United States Census Bureau cartographic boundary files
 U.S. Board on Geographic Names

External links

 Indiana Township Association
 United Township Association of Indiana

Townships in Daviess County, Indiana
Townships in Indiana
1817 establishments in Indiana
Populated places established in 1817